Daniel John Gillies is a New Zealand-Canadian actor, film producer, director and screenwriter. He played the role of Elijah Mikaelson on the television series The Vampire Diaries and its spin-off The Originals, as well as Dr. Joel Goran on the Canadian series Saving Hope, a medical-themed show with a mystical, paranormal twist. He wrote and directed the 2012 film, Broken Kingdom.

Early life
Gillies was born in Winnipeg, Manitoba, Canada to parents from New Zealand. When he was five, his parents decided to return to their native New Zealand, and moved to Invercargill and then to Hamilton. Though born into a family of strong medical background (his father is a pediatrician, his mother a nurse, and he is descended from the renowned ENT/plastic surgery pioneer Sir Harold Gillies), he became interested in acting because he said it was "the only thing I was ever any good at".

Frustrated with the lack of opportunities in New Zealand, he moved to Sydney, Australia for six weeks in 2001 before going to Canada for two months, where he worked as a waiter and dishwasher until deciding to move to Los Angeles, USA.

Career
Gillies began his career starring in several Auckland Theatre Company productions, before landing a two-season lead role in the television drama Street Legal. After deciding that his acting options in his native New Zealand were limited, Gillies explored his options in Sydney and Canada. Gillies then moved to Los Angeles and was soon cast in the movies Bride and Prejudice and Spider-Man 2.

Since 2002, Gillies has worked in Canadian and American film and television – at times simultaneously. Before landing lead roles in television series, Gillies landed guests spots on television shows such as Masters of Horror, NCIS, and True Blood. In 2010, he was cast on the hit The CW drama The Vampire Diaries as Elijah Mikaelson.  In 2013, CW created a successful spin-off of The Originals. chronicling the lives of the first (aka "the Original") vampires.  Gillies's recurring part as Elijah from The Vampire Diaries became a lead part in The Originals. A potential nightmare existed for CW since Gillies was already under contract to play Dr. Joel Goran in the supernatural series, Saving Hope. Saving Hope initially aired in the US on NBC, but the series was not renewed although it continued to run in Canada. He continued both shows.  In 2012, Gillies wrote, directed and starred with wife Rachael Leigh Cook in Broken Kingdom.

Personal life
Gillies married American actress Rachael Leigh Cook on 8 August 2004. Together they have a daughter, Charlotte, born in September 2013, and a son, Theodore, born in April 2015. In an interview in 2017, he revealed he pursued a vasectomy to prevent a third child from being brought into the family citing concerns about his age and energy levels, saying, "I want to be able to give these two my love and my attention and my care. I would like to stop now."

On 13 June 2019, both Cook and Gillies announced on Instagram that they mutually decided to separate and they also said that they wanted it to be as discreet as possible for the sake of their kids. On 10 July 2020 Gillies filed for divorce from Cook. Their divorce was finalized on 10 March 2021.

Filmography

Film

Television

Voice acting

References

External links

20th-century Canadian male actors
21st-century Canadian male actors
Canadian male film actors
Canadian male television actors
Canadian people of New Zealand descent
Canadian emigrants to New Zealand
Living people
New Zealand male film actors
New Zealand male television actors
Male actors from Winnipeg
People educated at Hamilton Boys' High School
Hill-McIndoe-Gillies family
20th-century New Zealand male actors
21st-century New Zealand male actors
1976 births